The 1991 European Promotion Cup for Women was the second edition of the basketball European Promotion Cup for Women, today known as FIBA Women's European Championship for Small Countries. The tournament took place in Gibraltar from 10 to 14 December 1991. Turkey women's national basketball team won the tournament for the first time.

Participating teams

First round
In the first round, the teams were drawn into two groups of four. The first two teams from each group advance to the semifinals, the other teams will play in the 5th–8th place playoffs.

Group A

Group B

5th–8th place playoffs

5th–8th place semifinals

7th place match

5th place match

Championship playoffs

Semifinals

3rd place match

Final

Final standings

References

FIBA Women's European Championship for Small Countries
Promotion Cup
International sports competitions hosted by Gibraltar
Basketball in Gibraltar
European Promotion Cup for Women